Frits Eddy Verheijen (born 21 March 1946) is a retired speed skater from the Netherlands. He competed at the 1972 Winter Olympics in the 500 and 1500 meter events finishing in 25th and 19th place, respectively. 

Verheijen married Rieneke Demming, an international speed skater. Their two sons, Frank and Carl, also became prominent speed skaters.

Personal records

Source

Verheijen has a score of 170.491 points on the Adelskalender

Tournament overview

 ISSL = International Speed Skating League [defunct]
 NC = No classification
 DNQ = Did not qualify for the final distance
source:

References

External links

 
 
 

1946 births
Living people
Dutch male speed skaters
Olympic speed skaters of the Netherlands
Speed skaters at the 1972 Winter Olympics
People from Vaals
Sportspeople from Limburg (Netherlands)